Starlite Lounge is the third studio album from American country music singer David Ball. It was his second album for Warner Bros. Records and was released in 1996. The album produced the singles "Circle of Friends"  and "Hangin' In and Hangin' On", which respectively reached #49 and #67 on the Billboard country charts. The latter was previously recorded by McBride & the Ride (whose members also co-wrote it along with Gary Nicholson) on their 1994 album Hurry Sundown.

Track listing
"Hangin' In and Hangin' On" (Terry McBride, Ray Herndon, Billy Thomas, Gary Nicholson) – 2:46
"Circle of Friends" (David Ball, Billy Spencer) – 2:48
"I've Got My Baby on My Mind" (Ball) – 3:07
"What Kind of Hold" (Ball, Tommy Polk) – 2:52
"I'll Never Make It Through This Fall" (Ball, Spencer) – 3:33
"Bad Day for the Blues" (Ball, Polk) – 2:33
"If You'd Like Some Lovin'" (Ball, Polk) – 3:12
"No More Lonely" (Ball, Polk) – 2:54
"I Never Did Know" (Ball, Dean Dillon) – 3:30
"The Bottle That Pours the Wine" (Ball, Allen Shamblin) – 4:22

Personnel
As listed in linernotes.
David Ball - acoustic guitar, lead vocals
Eddie Bayers - drums
Steve Buckingham - acoustic guitar, electric guitar
Mark Casstevens - harmonica
Paul Franklin - steel guitar, pedabro
John Hobbs - piano
Dann Huff - electric guitar
Roy Huskey, Jr. - upright bass
Alisa Jones - hammer dulcimer
Liana Manis - background vocals
Brent Mason - electric guitar
Joey Miskulin - accordion
Farrell Morris - vibraphone, percussion
Louis Dean Nunley - background vocals
Don Potter - acoustic guitar
Michael Rhodes - bass guitar
Brent Rowan - electric guitar
John Wesley Ryles - background vocals
Hank Singer - fiddle
Joe Spivey – fiddle, mandolin
Biff Watson - acoustic guitar
Dennis Wilson - background vocals
Curtis Young - background vocals
Reggie Young - electric guitar

Chart performance

References

Allmusic (see infobox)

1996 albums
David Ball (country singer) albums
Warner Records albums
Albums produced by Steve Buckingham (record producer)